The Politics of Hunan Province in the People's Republic of China is structured in a dual party-government system like all other governing institutions in mainland China.

The Governor of Hunan is the highest-ranking official in the People's Government of Hunan. However, in the province's dual party-government governing system, the Governor has less power than the Hunan Chinese Communist Party (CCP) Provincial Committee Secretary, colloquially termed the "Hunan CPC Party Chief".

List of secretaries of CCP Hunan Committee 
Huang Kecheng: 1949-1952
Jin Ming: 1952-1953
Zhou Xiaozhou: 1953-1957
Zhou Hui: 1957-1959
Zhang Pinghua:1959-1966
Wang Yanchun: 1966-1967
Li Yuan: 1968-1970
Hua Guofeng: 1970-1977
Mao Zhiyong: 1977-1988
Xiong Qingquan: 1988-1993
Wang Maolin: 1993-1998
Yang Zhengwu: 1998-2005
Zhang Chunxian: 2005-2010
Zhou Qiang: 2010–2013
Xu Shousheng: 2013-2016
Du Jiahao: 2016–2020
Xu Dazhe: 2020–2021
Zhang Qingwei: 2021-present

List of governors of Hunan

Qing dynasty
 Wu Dacheng (1895)

Pre-1949
 Zhang Jingyao (1918-1920) - military governor 
 Cheng Qian (1928)
 He Jian (1929-1937)
 Cheng Qian (1948)

People’s Republic of China
Chen Mingren: 1949-1950
Wang Shoudao: 1950-1952
Cheng Qian: 1952-1967
Li Yuan: 1968-1970
Hua Guofeng: 1970-1977
Mao Zhiyong: 1977-1979
Sun Guozhi: 1979-1983
Liu Zheng: 1983-1985
Xiong Qingquan: 1985-1989
Chen Bangzhu:1989-1995
Yang Zhengwu: 1995-1998
Chu Bo: 1998-2001
Zhang Yunchuan: 2001-2003
Zhou Bohua: 2003.03-2006
Zhou Qiang: 2006-2010
Xu Shousheng :2010-2013
Du Jiahao: 2013-2016
Xu Dazhe: 2016–2020
Mao Weiming: 2020–present

List of chairmen of Hunan People's Congress
Wan Da: 1979-1983
Sun Guozhi: 1983-1985
Jiao Linyi: 1985-1988
Liu Fusheng: 1988-1998
Wang Maolin: 1998
Yang Zhengwu: 1999-2006
Zhang Chunxian: 2006-2010
Zhou Qiang: 2010–2013
Xu Shousheng: 2013–2016
Du Jiahao: 2016–2020
Xu Dazhe: 2020–2021
Zhang Qingwei: 2021-present

List of chairmen of CPPCC Hunan Committee
Zhou Xiaozhou: 1955-1959
Zhang Pinghua: 1959-1967
Mao Zhiyong: 1977-1979
Zhou Li: 1979-1983
Cheng Xingling: 1983-1987
Liu Zheng: 1988-1998
Liu Fusheng: 1998-2001
Wang Keying: 2001-2003
Hu Biao: 2003-2013
Chen Qiufa: 2013-2016
Li Weiwei: 2016–present

Hunan
Hunan